Prionus coriarius (sometimes referred to as "the tanner" or "the sawyer") is a species of longhorn beetle.

Description
It is the most massive of European beetles. The female is larger than the male. Body is shiny, dark brown to black. The neck shield bears on each side three clearly distinct teeth. The serrated antennae of the male are composed of 12 segments. The ventral surface of the female is hairless, while in the male is pubescent.

Biology
The larvae are polyphagous, but they mainly develop in rotten wood of deciduous and coniferous trees. The life cycle lasts at least 3 years. Adults can be found from July to September. Its activity is mainly crepuscular and nocturnal.

Distribution
This species is  common in most of Europe and it is present in North Africa and in the Near East (Turkey, Caucasus, Transcaucasia, Iran).

References

Prioninae
Beetles of Europe
Beetles described in 1758